Center Point–Urbana Community School District (CPU) is a rural public school district headquartered in Center Point. The district is in Linn and Benton counties, and serves Center Point and Urbana.

History
The district formed on July 1, 1993, with the merger of the Center Point and Urbana districts.

In 2016, Matt Berninghaus, previously of the North Union Community School District, became the Center Point–Urbana superintendent.

Schools
 High School (Center Point)
 In 2010 the district was considering adding another parking lot. Berninghaus stated that there was a parking deficit for thirty students.
 Middle School (Center Point)
 Intermediate School (Urbana)
 Preschool/Primary School (Center Point)

Center Point High School

Athletics
The Stormin' Pointers compete in the WaMaC Conference in the following sports:

Baseball
Basketball (boys and girls)
Girls' Class 2A state champions - 1995 
 Girls' Class 3A state champions - 2019
Bowling
Cross country (boys and girls)
Football
Class 1A state champions - 1985
Golf (boys and girls)
 Boys' Class 2A state champions - 1998
Soccer (boys and girls)
Softball
Swimming (boys and girls)
Tennis (boys and girls)
Track and field (boys and girls)
Boys' Class 3A state champions - 2015
Volleyball
Wrestling

See also
List of school districts in Iowa
List of high schools in Iowa

References

Further reading
 Center Point-Urbana Community School District Profile -  Office of Social and Economic Trend Analysis (SETA), Iowa State University Iowa Community Indicators Program (ICIP), March 2005
 Center Point-Urbana Community School District Profile of Services - Grant Wood Area Education Agency

External links
 Center Point-Urbana Community School District

School districts in Iowa
School districts established in 1993
Education in Benton County, Iowa
Education in Linn County, Iowa
Schools in Linn County, Iowa
1993 establishments in Iowa